Hagrid's Magical Creatures Motorbike Adventure is a multiple-launch steel motorbike roller coaster located at The Wizarding World of Harry Potter – Hogsmeade section of Universal Orlando’s Islands of Adventure theme park. The attraction opened on June 13, 2019 and was manufactured by Intamin, and features both indoor and outdoor characteristics. It is the sixth Harry Potter-themed attraction created for the resort, with Universal describing it as "a highly-themed roller coaster that will take us into a different corner of the wizarding world, where guests will encounter some of their favorite characters and creatures". The attraction replaced the Dragon Challenge roller coasters, which closed on September 4, 2017. At $300 million, it held the record for the most expensive roller coaster ever built from 2019 to 2022, surpassing the previous record of $100 million by Expedition Everest at Disney's Animal Kingdom.

History
Construction for Hagrid's Magical Creatures Motorbike Adventure began early January 2018, after land clearing was completed on the site that Dueling Dragons occupied previously. According to Alan Gilmore, art director of the Potter films and The Wizarding World of Harry Potter, over a thousand trees were planted to create the woodland that would set the theme of the Forbidden Forest.

The vertical spike began to rise in May 2018 and was completed a few weeks later. By August 2018, the castle structure was being built, while portions of the track were covered in white plastic wrap. In October 2018, the structure for Hagrid's Hut was being swiftly constructed, several trees were then planted in the surrounding area and later on, the track layout was completed. On December 17, 2018, the first 7-car train, which was completely covered, was installed on the track in anticipation of the testing phase. 

On February 21, 2019, Universal Orlando announced more details about the coaster, including the name, Hagrid's Magical Creatures Motorbike Adventure, the ride vehicle design and an opening date for June 13, 2019. Ride testing began shortly after, on February 26, 2019. The Fluffy animatronic was completed early April 2019, around the same time final touches were made to the ride. It was confirmed that over twenty 13-inch cornish pixies would be found throughout the experience. Then, the unicorn animatronics were installed the following month. The attraction is one of the only coasters in the United States to feature a free-fall vertical drop.

Robbie Coltrane, who portrayed Rubeus Hagrid in the Harry Potter films and theme park attractions, reprised the role again for the roller coaster's pre-show and ride experience. Filming took place at Warner Bros. Studios, Leavesden in 2018 with Coltrane and Mark Williams, who reprised the role of Arthur Weasley for the pre-show, as well. Due to declining health, Coltrane's performance was filmed face-and-head only, while British actor Greg Draven was used as a body double for Hagrid; it was Robbie Coltrane's final performance as Hagrid before his death in 2022. The grand opening ceremony took place on June 11, 2019 with actors Evanna Lynch, Warwick Davis, Tom Felton, Rupert Grint and James and Oliver Phelps in attendance. Robbie Coltrane was unable to attend due to his health, however, he recorded video messages for the occasion.

Hagrid's Magical Creatures Motorbike Adventure offers an Express queue and a single rider queue that both bypass the pre-show, though Express didn't immediately open with the attraction. Just a day after opening, a reserved virtual line system was implemented for the attraction, through Universal Orlando's mobile application. Due to the coronavirus pandemic and its spread to Florida, the single rider line was made unavailable upon the resort's June 2020 reopening, but was reopened on June 15, 2021.

Characteristics
Described as a "story coaster" by Universal, the attraction takes Muggles on a journey through the Forbidden Forest, coming face to face with magical creatures of the Wizarding World on Rubeus Hagrid's motorcycle such as Fluffy the three-headed dog, Cornish Pixies, Devil's Snare, a Centaur and a Blast-Ended Skrewt, a creature that was never featured in any of the Harry Potter films.

The attraction's vehicle is modeled after Hagrid's motorcycle, originally owned by Sirius Black in the book series, which appeared in the first and seventh films. There are seven rows on each train. Each row seats two passengers, one on the motorcycle itself and one in the sidecar. Each motorbike has speakers that provide theming to the attraction, similar to The Incredible Hulk Coaster and the Hollywood Rip Ride Rockit, with a score inspired by the compositions of the Harry Potter films, especially those of John Williams.

With a maximum speed of 50 mph throughout seven launches, the ride includes more launches than any other roller coaster in the world. It is the second coaster in the United States to feature a vertical drop track at nearly 17 feet, and the longest roller coaster in Florida, measuring nearly a mile in length (5,053 ft). The track also features a "spike" that catapults guests 65 feet into the air at a more than 70-degree angle, followed by a backwards drop in one movement. The roller coaster is the third attraction at Universal Orlando to employ Virtual Line, after Race Through New York Starring Jimmy Fallon and Fast & Furious: Supercharged, the first one at Islands of Adventure and the first coaster to feature a virtual queue system at the resort. Due to popularity and high demand, on peak days such as weekends and holidays, the attraction only employs the use of Universal Virtual Line reservations from the Universal Orlando mobile application, instead of standby.

Ride experience

Queue
The exterior queue remains the same as Dragon Challenge, with the exception of the removal of the broken-down Ford Anglia, which was incorporated to the ride, and the pennants in support of the Triwizard Tournament champions. Muggles enter the Forbidden Forest by passing under the archway entrance, where they encounter signs along the way. A ring shaped path leads to a bridge over the exit pathway. Heading towards Flight of the Hippogriff, there is a flying horse made out of wood. Approaching a long switchback section, Muggles see huts, pumpkin patches and farming equipment. After passing a rose garden, Muggles cross the bridge and access a castle. Straight ahead, there is a vertical sculpture with a mermaid from the Black Lake surrounded by a couple of Grindylows. To the left of the sculpture is the castle entrance. Muggles enter a room with cages and several murals, such as Buckbeak and Ravenclaw. While walking down the hallway, there is a Dueling Club mural with ice and fire dragons, which pays tribute to Dragon Challenge. After this, Muggles head into a switchback room with a fireplace, pieces of wood, kitchenware and salamander footprints. This is followed by another storage room containing dragon eggs and more murals. After exiting the pre-show, Muggles pass along a study area with hourglasses, books, scales and other items. They can find several cards with creatures, including unicorns, cornish pixies, manticores and nifflers, as well as the Book of Monsters. Then, Muggles follow some dark hallways. Getting closer, they spot a test seat and a screen that shows safety instructions. After another switchback area, Muggles enter the station, where they stand on a moving conveyor belt and climb into the ride vehicles.

Pre-show
Rubeus Hagrid (played by Robbie Coltrane) will take Muggles on a very special Care of Magical Creatures class and has acquired the help of Arthur Weasley (played by Mark Williams) to tinker with Hagrid's motorbike, whose original owner is mentioned to be Sirius Black, in an attempt to duplicate it in order to take Muggles to the edge of the Forbidden Forest. After Arthur successfully duplicates the motorbike, Fang, Hagrid's pet boarhound, releases Cornish Pixies that were covered in their cage and start to wreak havoc by taking Arthur's wand, burning the duplicate motorbike and then blowing it up. Arthur then casts Aguamenti to put down the flames and sprays Muggles with water before Hagrid departs to wait for them. Arthur then tells Muggles that he will try to duplicate the motorbike again at the stables, where there is plenty of space to do so and departs with the original motorbike following him before casting Reparo on it.

The pre-show is sometimes preempted during longer-than-usual wait times and, instead, Fang is seen walking around.

Layout

The ride begins by turning right out of the loading station. Hagrid says he will meet up with the Muggles at an abandoned hut at the edge of the Forbidden Forest. Once the bikes reach Hagrid's hut, a Blast-Ended Skrewt sprays smoke at the riders as the giant himself tells them they'll pick up the rest of the lesson later. The vehicles head up an airtime hill, passing by the abandoned castle and making a left-handed dive into a tunnel. While going through a double right turn, Hagrid warns that the bikes are out of his control and are flying into the Forbidden Forest. The vehicles then make a right turn and slow down on the mid-course brake run. Fluffy, the three-headed dog can be found on the left side. They speed into a tunnel with a group of Cornish Pixies that have taken over Arthur Weasley's broken-down flying Ford Anglia on top. The vehicles slow down into the darkest part of the Forbidden Forest as the Muggles pass a centaur, stopping in the tentacles of Devil's Snare. Hagrid encourages Muggles to say the incantation "Lumos Solem" and then free-fall  into a cave filled with glowing Blast-Ended Skrewts around riders, which Hagrid congratulates for finding them. During this launch, Muggles are told to push the button in front of them to expel dragon fire-breath. Fog effects begin to appear in a straight line near the tracks. The vehicles hit a left banked turn and pass the on-ride camera, which takes photos of the guests. After this, the vehicles make a right turn before stopping at the abandoned castle, where a unicorn and her baby are spotted, thus ending the ride. As the vehicles slow down into the unloading area, Hagrid thanks and asks them not to tell anyone at Hogwarts about the experience.

Reception
Hagrid's Magical Creatures Motorbike Adventure was positively received by guests on opening day. It was awarded the Golden Ticket Award for Best New Attraction Installation by Amusement Today in 2019 and was awarded second place for Best New Roller Coaster.

Incidents
On October 2, 2019, the roller coaster was temporarily shut down after a swarm of honey bees surrounded the attraction. A small fire broke out in the backstage area of the attraction on August 11, 2020, prompting a full evacuation without injuries. The fire was extinguished but the attraction remained closed a couple of days later.

Technical difficulties
The attraction "has been plagued by downtime problems from day one" and has been cited as "one of the most unreliable in the entire theme park industry". During some months, the ride was unavailable about half of the time the park was open and Universal has not publicly stated what the problems are and if/when they can be resolved.

See also
 Harry Potter and the Escape from Gringotts, an enclosed Harry Potter roller coaster located at sister theme park Universal Studios Florida
 Tron Lightcycle Power Run, a motorbike roller coaster at Shanghai Disneyland Park and Magic Kingdom
 Verbolten, the first roller coaster in the United States to feature a drop track located at Busch Gardens Williamsburg

References

External links

 
 Hagrid's Magical Creatures Motorbike Adventure at RCDB

2019 establishments in Florida
Roller coasters in Florida
Amusement rides based on film franchises
Islands of Adventure
Roller coasters introduced in 2019
Roller coasters operated by Universal Parks & Resorts
Warner Bros. Global Brands and Experiences attractions
Wizarding World
Licensed properties at Universal Parks & Resorts